Furman may refer to:

Places
 Furman, Alabama, an unincorporated community in Wilcox County, United States
 Furman, South Carolina, a town in Hampton County, United States
 Furman, Alberta, Canada
 Furman, Poland
 Furman Bluffs, Marie Byrd Land, Antarctica
 Furman Historic District, a historic district in the community of Furman, Alabama, United States

Other
 Furman (surname), including a list of people with the name
 Furman v. Georgia, a United States Supreme Court decision that temporarily abolished capital punishment in the U.S.
 Furman Center for Real Estate and Urban Policy, a joint center at New York University School of Law and the NYU Wagner School of Public Service
 Furman University, Greenville, South Carolina

See also 
 Forman (disambiguation)
 Foreman (disambiguation)
 Fuhrman, a surname
 Furmanov (disambiguation)